Anexaireta is a genus of flies in the family Stratiomyidae.

Species
Anexaireta castanea (James, 1975)
Anexaireta gracilis (James, 1975)
Anexaireta hyacinthina (Bigot, 1879)
Anexaireta lateralis (James, 1975)
Anexaireta solvoides (James, 1975)
Anexaireta therevoides (James, 1975)
Anexaireta variicolor (James, 1975)

References

Stratiomyidae
Brachycera genera
Diptera of South America